first opened as the  in Hakodate, Hokkaidō, Japan in 1989.

See also

 Hokkaido Museum of Northern Peoples
 List of Important Tangible Folk Cultural Properties
 Nibutani Ainu Culture Museum
 Hokkaido Museum
 Goryōkaku

References

External links
  Hakodate City Museum of Northern Peoples

Museums in Hakodate
Museums established in 1989
1989 establishments in Japan
Ainu
Ethnic museums